Magnolia 'Elizabeth' is a hybrid Magnolia that is the offspring of a cross between Magnolia acuminata (cucumbertree) and Magnolia denudata (Yulan magnolia). It is the result of a breeding program to create yellow-flowered varieties conducted at the Brooklyn Botanic Garden beginning in 1953. The cream to pale yellow flowered Magnolia 'Elizabeth' gained the Royal Horticultural Society's Award of Garden Merit in 1993. It is named for Elizabeth Van Brunt, who donated funds to the Brooklyn Botanic Garden.

References

Interspecific plant hybrids
Ornamental plant cultivars
Ornamental trees
Elizabeth